The Cupid's bow is a facial feature where the double curve of a human upper lip is said to resemble the bow of Cupid, the Roman god of erotic love. The peaks of the bow coincide with the philtral columns giving a prominent bow appearance to the lip.

See also
 Philtrum
White roll

References

External links 

Facial features
Phrases and idioms derived from Greek mythology
Cupid
Lips